Victor Zvunka (born 15 November 1951 in Le Ban-Saint-Martin) is a French former football defender and football manager most recently in charge of Sporting Club Toulon.

Honours

As a player
Marseille
Coupe de France: 1976

As a coach
Châteauroux
Championnat National: 1993–94
Ligue 2: 1996–97

Guingamp
Coupe de France: 2009

References

External links
 
 
 Profile at FC Metz
 

1951 births
Living people
Sportspeople from Moselle (department)
French people of Romanian descent
French footballers
France international footballers
Association football defenders
Ligue 1 players
FC Metz players
Olympique de Marseille players
Stade Lavallois players
Racing Club de France Football players
French football managers
Valenciennes FC managers
Chamois Niortais F.C. managers
Toulouse FC managers
LB Châteauroux managers
OGC Nice managers
FC Lausanne-Sport managers
Stade Lavallois managers
FC Gueugnon managers
En Avant Guingamp managers
Ligue 1 managers
AS Cannes managers
Expatriate football managers in Portugal
Expatriate football managers in Switzerland
Racing Club de France Football managers
Amiens SC managers
Associação Naval 1º de Maio managers
Nîmes Olympique managers
SC Toulon managers
Footballers from Grand Est
French expatriate sportspeople in Portugal
French expatriate sportspeople in Switzerland
French expatriate sportspeople in Algeria
French expatriate sportspeople in Tunisia
French expatriate sportspeople in Guinea
French expatriate football managers
Expatriate football managers in Algeria
Expatriate football managers in Guinea
Expatriate football managers in Tunisia